Lawrence Zimba (born 22 April 1955) is a Zambian politician. He served as Member of the National Assembly for Kapiri Mposhi from 2011 until 2013.

Biography
Prior to entering politics, Zimba worked as an agricultural mechanic. He contested the Kapiri Mposhi seat as the Movement for Multi-Party Democracy candidate in the 2011 general elections and was elected with a majority of 7,000. However, defeated Patriotic Front candidate Eddie Musonda successfully challenged the result in the Supreme Court, resulting in a by-election on 23 April 2013. By then Zimba had defected to the United Party for National Development (UPND) and was the UPND candidate in the by-election, losing by a margin of 1,144 votes to Musonda.

References

1955 births
Living people
Movement for Multi-Party Democracy politicians
United Party for National Development politicians
Members of the National Assembly of Zambia